Vallarta may refer to:

Puerto Vallarta, the full name of a city in Jalisco, Mexico
Nuevo Vallarta, a planned residential-resort community in the state of Nayarit, Mexico
Ignacio Vallarta, Mexican jurist and governor of Jalisco, Mexico (1872-1876)
Vallarta Supermarkets, U.S.A.